Yeahwon Shin is a vocalist born in South Korea.

She has performed with Egberto Gismonti. Her debut album entitled Yeahwon(2010) received a Latin Grammy nomination for Best Musica Popular Brasileira Album in 2011. Her second album Lua Ya was released in August 2013 by ECM with pianist Aaron Parks and accordionist Rob Curto.

Discography 
 Yeahwon (ArtistShare, 2010)
 Lua ya (ECM, 2013) – recorded in 2012

References

External links

Living people
South Korean women singers
Year of birth missing (living people)
ArtistShare artists
ECM Records artists